Jarryd Morton (born 5 October 1988) is an Australian rules footballer formerly in the Australian Football League (AFL) with the Hawthorn Football Club.

Morton played across the half-back flanks and wore the number 19 guernsey. His two brothers also played in the AFL. Cale played for Melbourne and West Coast and Mitch played for West Coast, Richmond and Sydney.

Morton picked up a NAB Rising Star nomination in Round 13 of the 2008 season.

Statistics

|- style=background:#EAEAEA
| 2007 ||  || 35
| 0 || — || — || — || — || — || — || — || — || — || — || — || — || — || — || 0
|-
| 2008 ||  || 35
| 8 || 0 || 1 || 66 || 85 || 151 || 41 || 11 || 0.0 || 0.1 || 8.3 || 10.6 || 18.9 || 5.1 || 1.4 || 0
|- style=background:#EAEAEA
| 2009 ||  || 35
| 9 || 5 || 6 || 86 || 73 || 159 || 51 || 21 || 0.6 || 0.7 || 9.6 || 8.1 || 17.7 || 5.7 || 2.3 || 0
|-
| 2010 ||  || 19
| 5 || 7 || 2 || 33 || 33 || 66 || 25 || 9 || 1.4 || 0.4 || 6.6 || 6.6 || 13.2 || 5.0 || 1.8 || 0
|- style=background:#EAEAEA
| 2011 ||  || 19
| 0 || — || — || — || — || — || — || — || — || — || — || — || — || — || — || 0
|- class="sortbottom"
! colspan=3| Career
! 22 !! 12 !! 9 !! 185 !! 191 !! 376 !! 117 !! 41 !! 0.5 !! 0.4 !! 8.4 !! 8.7 !! 17.1 !! 5.3 !! 1.9 !! 0
|}

Honours and achievements
Individual
  AFL Rising Star nominee: 2008

References

External links

1988 births
Living people
Hawthorn Football Club players
People educated at Hale School
Australian rules footballers from Western Australia
People from Lake Grace, Western Australia
Claremont Football Club players
Perth Football Club players
Box Hill Football Club players